Rigaud may refer to:

People
Cyrille Rigaud (1750–1824), French poet from Occitania
Auguste Rigaud (1760–1835), French poet
André Rigaud (1761–1811), Haitian revolutionary
Clément Rigaud (b.1984), French football player
Émile Rigaud (1824-1890), French lawyer and politician
François-Pierre Rigaud de Vaudreuil (1703-1779), Governor of Montreal, New France (now Canada)
Gaspard Rigaud (1661-1705), French painter
George Rigaud (1905-1984), Argentine film actor
Hyacinthe Rigaud (1659–1743), French baroque portrait painter
Jean Rigaud (1912–1999), French painter
John Francis Rigaud (1742-1810), French/Italian painter
Joseph Hyacinthe François de Paule de Rigaud, Comte de Vaudreuil (1740-1817), French nobleman
Louis-Philippe de Rigaud de Vaudreuil (1691-1763), French naval officer
Philippe de Rigaud Vaudreuil (c.1643–1725), Governor-general of New France (now Canada)
Pierre de Rigaud, Marquis de Vaudreuil-Cavagnial (1698–1778), Canadian-born French Governor-general of New France (now Canada)
Stephen Francis Dutilh Rigaud (1777-1861), English painter
Stephen Peter Rigaud (1774–1839), English mathematical historian and astronomer
Stephen Rigaud (1816-1859), English clergyman and schoolmaster
Rigaud of Assier (d.1323), Bishop of Winchester, England

Places
Rigaud, Alpes-Maritimes, a commune in the Alpes-Maritimes département of France
Rigaud, Quebec, a municipality west of Montreal, Canada
Rigaud River, river in Ontario and Quebec, Canada
Ski Mont Rigaud, ski area in Quebec, Canada

Other
 Rigaud, Pons & Compagnie, French bookselling firm in the 18th century